Sanayi is an underground rapid transit station on the M2 line of the Istanbul Metro. It is located under Büyükdere Avenue between Levent and Maslak, Istanbul's two main financial districts. The station was opened on 31 January 2009 as part of the northern extension to Atatürk Oto Sanayi and has two island platforms serviced by three tracks. Sanayi is one of five stations of the Istanbul Metro to have this layout along with Otogar, Yenikapı, Bostancı and Olimpiyat. The M2 shuttle service to Seyrantepe originates and terminates at Sanayi station on its own track.

Layout

References

Railway stations opened in 2009
Istanbul metro stations
Sarıyer
Kağıthane
2009 establishments in Turkey